Thomas Wheeldon Jr. (born 3 May 1979) is an English-Canadian former professional footballer and current head coach of Cavalry FC in the Canadian Premier League.

Playing career
Wheeldon began his playing career in England with Swindon Town before moving to Torquay United.

In May 2002, Wheeldon joined the Calgary Storm of the A-League to play under the management of his father, Tommy Wheeldon Sr. He went on to make 28 appearances for the club across two seasons. During his time as a player, he also worked as a full-time academy coach and soccer camp director for the club.

Coaching career

Calgary Foothills 
After the Calgary Storm folded, Wheeldon decided to remain in Canada and help develop grassroots football. After four years as a director for a local soccer academy, he joined the Calgary Foothills as assistant technical director in 2007 and was promoted to technical director a year later. In 2015, Wheeldon was named as head coach as the club joined the Premier Development League. In his second season as head coach, Wheeldon guided the team to an appearance in the PDL Championship Final before losing to the Michigan Bucks. In 2016, Wheeldon received the Jack Buckler Award for outstanding contribution to the sport of soccer within Calgary and area.

After having accepted the role as head coach and general manager of Cavalry FC, Wheeldon led Calgary Foothills to the 2018 PDL Championship, defeating Reading United AC 4-2.

Canada Soccer 
In April 2014, Wheeldon began a two-year spell as assistant coach for the Canada U17 men's national team.

Cavalry FC 
On 18 May 2018, Wheeldon was announced as the first head coach and general manager of Canadian Premier League club Cavalry FC. Wheeldon signed 12 players from the Foothills to Cavalry, including captain Nik Ledgerwood and goalkeeper Marco Carducci. Under Wheeldon's coaching, Cavalry won both the spring and fall seasons in the 2019 Canadian Premier League season. Cavalry also made it to the semifinals of the 2019 Canadian Championship, where they lost to the Major League Soccer team Montreal Impact. Along the way, Cavalry had defeated fellow Canadian Premier League sides Pacific FC and Forge FC as well as the Vancouver Whitecaps in the quarterfinals, becoming the only CPL team to win against an MLS team. Wheeldon would win the CPL coach of the year for the 2019 season.

Personal life
Wheeldon was born in Liverpool, England. His father, Tommy Wheeldon Sr, was a professional footballer who represented Everton and England Under-18s.

He attended the University of Surrey to study sports science and coaching.

Wheeldon is a lifelong Everton supporter.

Career statistics

Player

Manager

Honours

Calgary Foothills
USL League Two
Champions: 2018
 Western Conference Champions: 2016, 2018
 Northwest Division Champions: 2016, 2018

Cavalry
Canadian Premier League (Regular season): 
Champions: Spring 2019, Fall 2019
 Canadian Premier League Finals
Runners-up: 2019

Individual
 Canadian Premier League :
 Coach of the Year: 2019

References

1979 births
Living people
Association football defenders
English footballers
English football managers
Footballers from Liverpool
Expatriate soccer players in Canada
English expatriate footballers
English expatriate sportspeople in Canada
English expatriate football managers
Swindon Town F.C. players
Torquay United F.C. players
Calgary Storm players
A-League (1995–2004) players
Cavalry FC non-playing staff
USL League Two coaches